Corydon may refer to:

Literature
Corydon (character), a stock name for a shepherd in pastorals
Corydon (book), an early 20th-century book by André Gide

People
Bent Corydon (born 1942), American author and journalist
Bjarne Corydon (born 1973), Danish former politician and Finance Minister
Corydon Beckwith (1823–1890), American jurist and lawyer
Corydon Bell (1894–1980), American author of children's books
Corydon Partlow Brown (1848–1891), Canadian politician
Corydon M. Wassell (1884–1958), U.S. Navy physician and recipient of the Navy Cross

Places in the United States
Corydon, Indiana, a town
Corydon Historic District
Corydon, Iowa, a city
Corydon, Kentucky, a home rule-class city
Corydon Township (disambiguation)

Other uses
Corydon Avenue, a segment of Winnipeg Route 95 in Winnipeg, Manitoba, Canada
Corydon (bird), a genus of broadbill containing a single species, the dusky broadbill
Battle of Corydon, in the American Civil War

See also
Croydon (disambiguation)